John Gibb Bothwell (1909 or 1910 – 1994) was a British trade union leader.

Bothwell became a junior clerk with the London and North Eastern Railway when he was sixteen years old.  He joined the Railway Clerks' Association, and from 1939 began working full-time in its Scottish office.  In 1950, he was appointed as the Scottish secretary of the union.  He became active in the Scottish Trades Union Congress, and served as its president in 1954.  In 1956, he was made an Officer of the Order of the British Empire.

In 1960, Bothwell was elected as assistant general secretary of the union, by now renamed as the Transport Salaried Staffs' Association (TSSA).  He became general secretary in 1963, and was also elected to the General Council of the Trades Union Congress, and in 1965 to the general council of the International Transport Workers' Federation.  He retired from his trade union posts in 1968, due to poor health.  However, he remained active as a member of the Industrial Arbitration Board, for which work he was made a Commander of the Order of the British Empire.

References

General Secretaries of the Transport Salaried Staffs' Association
Members of the General Council of the Trades Union Congress
20th-century births
1994 deaths
Year of birth uncertain